The Southern League Pitcher of the Year Award is an annual award given to the best pitcher in Minor League Baseball's Southern League based on their regular-season performance as voted on by league managers. League broadcasters, Minor League Baseball executives, and members of the media have previously voted as well. Though the league was established in 1964, the Most Outstanding Pitcher Award, as it was originally known, was not created until 1972. After the cancellation of the 2020 season, the league was known as the Double-A South in 2021 before reverting to the Southern League name in 2022. The award became known as the Pitcher of the Year Award in 2021.

Eight players from the Jacksonville Suns have been selected for the Pitcher of the Year Award, more than any other team in the league, followed by the Birmingham Barons and Nashville Sounds (5); the Biloxi Shuckers, Charlotte Knights, Columbus Astros, Greenville Braves, Tennessee Smokies, Orlando Twins, and Jackson Generals (3); the Chattanooga Lookouts and Mobile BayBears (2); and the Carolina Mudcats, Charlotte Hornets, Huntsville Stars, Mississippi Braves, Montgomery Biscuits, Nashville Xpress, Pensacola Blue Wahoos, and Rocket City Trash Pandas (1).

Five players from the Cincinnati Reds and Minnesota Twins Major League Baseball (MLB) organizations have each won the award, more than any others, followed by the Atlanta Braves, Chicago White Sox, and Milwaukee Brewers organizations (4); the Houston Astros, Miami Marlins, New York Yankees, Seattle Mariners, and Toronto Blue Jays organizations (3); the Baltimore Orioles, Chicago Cubs, Detroit Tigers, Los Angeles Dodgers, and Washington Nationals organizations (2); and the Arizona Diamondbacks, Los Angeles Angels, San Diego Padres, and Tampa Bay Rays organizations (1).

Winners

Wins by team

Active Southern League teams appear in bold.

Wins by organization

Active Southern League–Major League Baseball affiliations appear in bold.

References
Specific

General

Awards established in 1972
Minor league baseball trophies and awards
Most valuable player awards
Pitcher